Elizabeth Mary Rolleston (30 March 1845 – 4 June 1940), known as Mary Rolleston, was a New Zealand homemaker, political hostess and community leader.

She was born as Elizabeth Mary Brittan in Castleton, Dorset, England in 1845. Her parents were Joseph Brittan, a surgeon and newspaper proprietor, and Elizabeth Mary Brittan (née Chandler). She had five siblings, two of whom died in infancy and a fortnight after the birth and then death of the last child in 1849, her mother herself died. The surviving siblings were Joseph (Joe), Arthur, and Frances (Frank).

Mary Brittan married William Rolleston on 24 May 1865 at Holy Trinity Avonside. She died in Christchurch on 4 June 1940.

Notes

References

1845 births
1940 deaths
English emigrants to New Zealand
19th-century New Zealand people
New Zealand salon-holders
Mary 
Brittan family